Pianezze is a town and comune in the province of Vicenza, Veneto, Italy. It is north of SP111.  As of 2007 Pianezze had an estimated population of 1,988.

Sources

Cities and towns in Veneto